William Northey may refer to:
William Northey (ice hockey), ice hockey executive
William Northey (died 1770), English MP for Maidstone, Great Bedwyn and Calne
William Northey (died 1738), English MP for Wootton Bassett and Calne
Bill Northey, American politician

See also
William Northey Hooper, sugar producer